Buffalo Mountain Presbyterian Church and Cemetery is a historic Presbyterian church located near Willis, Floyd County, Virginia. It was the first of the 5 "rock churches" founded by Bob Childress. It was built in 1929, and is a rock-faced frame building with a nave plan and front and rear transepts.  The nave measures 33 feet wide and 80 feet long. It has a steeply-pitched gable roof covered with standing seam sheet metal.  The contributing Cemetery has a continuous wall of mortared quartzitic fieldstones, matching the church exterior.

It was added to the National Register of Historic Places in 2007.

See also
Bluemont Presbyterian Church and Cemetery
Dinwiddie Presbyterian Church and Cemetery
Slate Mountain Presbyterian Church and Cemetery
Willis Presbyterian Church and Cemetery

References

External links
 Official Buffalo Mountain Presbyterian Church Website
Stone Churches of Reverend Bob Childress

External links

Churches completed in 1929
20th-century Presbyterian church buildings in the United States
Churches in Carroll County, Virginia
Churches on the National Register of Historic Places in Virginia
Protestant Reformed cemeteries
Presbyterian churches in Virginia
National Register of Historic Places in Carroll County, Virginia